Leslie Gordon Knight,  (7 March 1921 – 16 September 1943) was an Australian bomber pilot in the Royal Australian Air Force during the Second World War. He was awarded the Distinguished Service Order in 1943 for his role in Operation Chastise while flying with No. 617 Squadron RAF. Knight's crew, flying in N-Nan, attacked, hit and breached the Eder Dam, the second dam to be attacked, after his comrades had previously scored one hit and one miss.

Knight was killed later the same year while taking part in Operation Garlic – the Dortmund–Ems Canal raid. After his Lancaster's engines were damaged by clipping a tree while flying at low level, he was able to allow his entire crew to bail out but was unable to land the aircraft without crashing. He is buried at Den Ham General Cemetery in the Netherlands.

In the 1955 film The Dam Busters, Knight was played by Denys Graham.

References

External links
 Dambuster of the Day No. 57: Leslie Knight – Dambusters Blog

1921 births
1943 deaths
Australian Companions of the Distinguished Service Order
Australian military personnel killed in World War II
Australian World War II pilots
Aviators from Melbourne
Military personnel from Melbourne
Royal Australian Air Force officers
Royal Australian Air Force personnel of World War II